Anders J. Dahlin (born March 12, 1975) is a Swedish tenor.

Music career
In 1998 he made his operatic debut at the Norwegian National Opera as Tom Wingfield in Antonio Bibalo's opera Die Glasmenagerie (after  Tennessee Williams' The Glass Menagerie). In recent years he has become one of the leading interpreters of the early French Baroque music. He is a sought after Evangelist in J. S. Bach's passions and has worked over the years with conductors like John Eliot Gardiner, William Christie, Christophe Rousset, Emmanuelle Haïm, René Jacobs, Hervé Niquet, Marc Minkowski, Andreas Spering, Alexis Kossenko, Eric Ericson and François-Xavier Roth. Dahlin is the recipient of the Jussi Björling Award for 2014.

Opera roles 
F. Cavalli
 Gli amori d'Apollo e di Dafne, Apollo
J. P. Rameau
 Zoroastre, title role
 Platée, title role, Mercure. Thespis
 Les Indes galantes, Carlos, Tacmas, Valère, Damon
 Castor et Pollux, Castor, L'Atlète, Mercure
 Dardanus, title role

M. A Charpentier
 David et Jonathas H.490, David
 Medée H.491, Jason, Berger, Phantome, Corinthien

Campra
 Sémélé, Adraste
 L'Europe galante, Dom Pedro

Lully
 Roland, Insulaire, Coridon
 Armide, un amant fortuné

W. A Mozart
 Die Entführung aus dem Serail, Belmonte
 Così fan tutte, Ferrando
 Mitridate, Marzio

C. Monteverdi
 L'Orfeo, Pastore 1, Echo
 L'incoronazione di Poppea, Soldato 1, Lucano, Famigliare 1, Tribuno, Ottone, Nutrice
 Il ritorno d'Ulisse in patria, Telemaco, humana fragilità

H. Purcell
 The Fairy-Queen, Chinese man, Theseus
 King Arthur, various roles
 The Indian Queen, various roles

H. Demarets
 Vénus et Adonis

A. Bibalo
 The Glass Menagerie, Tom Wingfield

H. Hellstenius
 Sera. Abel

References

External links
 Andreas J. Dahlin Operabase

1975 births
Living people
Swedish operatic tenors
21st-century Swedish singers
21st-century Swedish male singers